Adolfo Sousa Gregorio (born October 1, 1982) is a former American soccer midfielder who formerly played for Real Salt Lake of Major League Soccer.

Gregorio was part of the original 1999 class at the Bradenton Academy, whereas part of the Under-17 United States national team. He played for his country at the 1999 Under-17 World Cup in New Zealand and also represented the U.S. on the Under-20 level.

After playing college soccer at UCLA, where he helped the Bruins to the College Cup in 2002, Gregorio then briefly played alongside Jürgen Klinsmann for Orange County Blue Star in the USL Premier Development League.

Gregorio was chosen by Colorado Rapids with the 15th pick of the 2004 MLS SuperDraft. However, he elected to try his luck in Europe, signing with English club Darlington. After one year in England, Gregorio returned to the US after his rights were acquired by Real Salt Lake, then led by his former Under-17 coach, John Ellinger. RSL traded a permanent international roster slot and a first-round pick in the 2007 MLS Supplemental Draft to Colorado for the right to sign Gregorio.

Gregorio was released by Real Salt Lake during the 2006 preseason.

References

External links

1982 births
Living people
American soccer players
American expatriate soccer players
UCLA Bruins men's soccer players
Orange County Blue Star players
Darlington F.C. players
Real Salt Lake players
USL League Two players
English Football League players
Major League Soccer players
Soccer players from California
Expatriate footballers in England
Colorado Rapids draft picks
United States men's youth international soccer players
United States men's under-23 international soccer players
Association football midfielders